16-Love is a 2012 American romantic comedy film directed by Adam Lipsius, written by Leigh Dunlap, and starring Lindsey Shaw, Chandler Massey, Keith Coulouris, Lindsey Black, and Susie Abromeit. Produced by Ilyssa Goodman, and Adam Lipsius, the story centers on a 16-year-old female tennis prodigy who while sidelined by injury discovers the normal teenage life she has missed out on, including falling in love. It was released on January 20, 2012 in the United States.

Plot
Ally Mash is a 16 year old San Diego high school student who is also the number one American junior tennis player. She has never had a normal life due to her father's obsessive coaching, but things change when she suffers an injury playing a fiercely competitive Russian rival. Sidelined, she skips her father's rehabilitation training and coaches a low-level player, Farrell Gambles, while discovering a normal teenage life including falling in love. Concurrently she builds up to a rematch with her Russian rival.

Cast

Lindsey Shaw as Ally Mash
Chandler Massey as Farrell Gambles
Keith Coulouris as Dave Mash
Lindsey Black as Rebecca
Susie Abromeit as Katina Upranova
Mark Elias as Nate
Steven Christopher Parker as Stuart
Alexandra Paul as Margo Mash
Josh Cooke as Dr. Jim
Josh Blaylock as Red Bull
Sarah Lilly as Amy
Fabienne Guerin as Debbie

Production
Leigh Dunlap wrote a filmscript called "Smash" about a teenage tennis romantic comedy that formed the basis of 16-Love. The script was promoted by producer Ilyssa Goodman who, in November, 2009, offered it to Adam Lipsius and his wife who had created the film company Uptown 6 Productions. They liked the script and decided to make the film.

Lindsey Shaw was cast in the lead after impressing Lipsius at her audition. He recollected: "... She was so professional and passionate, I just saw her as Ally Mash". Writer Dunlap picked Chandler Massey for male lead due to his acting skills and tennis skill, she wrote: " ... I fought the creative battle of my life to get (Massey) cast as the lead". Lipsius was unconvinced by Massey at first but after playing a tennis game with him and discovering his romantic nature he decided he was right for the part. Susie Abromeit, cast as the Russian player, was a top ten ranked junior who had a Duke University tennis scholarship.

Shooting took place in the San Diego  area and Denver  over 21 days with ten of those days on a tennis court. Lipsius described the "vital closeness" of shooting the tennis scenes with close-ups of the players' faces to create intensity. CGI visual effects were used to transform 250 spectators into 2000.

Massey commented that shooting the film was "... one of the greatest experiences of my life".

Release
16-Love premiered in the United States on January 20, 2012 with a limited theatrical release along with television rotation, DVD release and on-line streaming.

Reception
In her review of 16-Love for The New York Times, Jeannette Catsoulis criticized the script and direction as being clichéd. She considered: " ... 16-Love is in a sense the perfect movie for teenagers - you can text and tweet to your heart's content and never miss a thing". In his review for Common Sense Media, Renee Schonfeld gave two stars from five. He criticized one-dimensional characters, teen film clichés, and excessive product placement, while praising the performances of Shaw and Massey. He concluded: " ... There's plenty of innocent romance and just enough tennis to hold the audience's interest and keep the story moving". Dennis Harvey, reviewing for Variety criticized the script as predictable but praised the direction and performances. He concluded: " first time feature helmer Adam Lipsius keeps things slick and pacey, and the cast is decent within mostly one-dimensional roles".

See also

 List of media set in San Diego

References

External links

2010s sports comedy films
2012 romantic comedy films
American romantic comedy films
American sports comedy films
2012 films
Tennis films
2010s English-language films
Films set in San Diego
2010s American films
Films shot in San Diego
Films shot in Denver